WDUL (970 AM) is a radio station licensed in Superior, Wisconsin. The station is owned and operated by Midwest Communications, which owns six stations in Duluth, Minnesota. All the Duluth stations share the same studio location at 11 East Superior St. Suite 380, downtown Duluth.

WDUL previously aired programming from the CBS Sports Radio network. WDUL's main competition when their format was standards was WKLK in Cloquet, Minnesota, coincidentally a former "Music of Your Life" affiliate station, which now features America's Best Music from Dial Global.

The station adopted its standards format in September 2008. Prior to that, WDUL aired ESPN Radio programming, as well as The Jim Rome Show and Loveline. It was also the local home of NASCAR races and ESPN Sunday Night Baseball.

History
The station was first licensed on August 10, 1959, with the callsign WQMN, as a new 1,000-watt daytime-only station transmitting on 1320 kHz, and licensed to Quality Radio, Inc. in Superior, Wisconsin. At noon on May 9, 1964, the station became the first Duluth/Superior radio station to change its callsign when it became WAKX ("WAX"), playing a Top 40 format. Lance "Tac" Hammer was the station's first program director.

WAKX moved to 970 kHz, formerly the home of WIGL in Superior, on October 26, 1967. The 1320 kHz frequency in the Duluth/Superior market is no longer in use.

Owner Lew Latto purchased the facilities of beautiful music station KPIR in September 1974, and began simulcasting the format of WAKX on both 970 AM and the new 98.9 FM.

In 1982, the AM station changed its callsign to KXTP and switched to adult standards, airing the "Music of Your Life" syndicated format. WAKX-FM remained unchanged.

In 1994, Latto sold KXTP and WAKX to Ken Beuhler and Patty McNulty, the owners of WDSM and KZIO (currently KDKE). The FM station flipped from classic rock to country music and became KTCO. Later that decade, Buehler and McNulty sold their stations to Shockley Communications, which changed KXTP's format to country and then Radio Disney. It later changed to Hot Talk, and finally, to Sports.

Today, the station is owned by Midwest Communications which also owns KDAL, WDSM, KDAL-FM and KDKE in Duluth.

AM 970 regained the "Music of Your Life" format in September 2008, dropping ESPN Radio and returning the Music of Your Life to the Duluth/Superior airwaves.

On March 7, 2014, WGEE changed formats from adult standards to sports, with programming from CBS Sports Radio.

On March 16, 2015, WGEE changed calls to WDUL.

On November 4, 2020, WDUL rebranded as "970 The Game" with weekday daytime programming originating from WRNW in Milwaukee.

On April 25, 2022, WDUL changed formats from sports to full-fledged top 40/CHR, branded as "Hot 98.1" competing against CHR (Top 40) KBMX/107.7 "Mix 108". The prior sports format was moved to sister WDSM. This also returns the CHR format to 970 AM for the first time since WAKX signed off in 1982.

Previous logo

References

External links
Website for Midwest Communications
WAKX history
WAKX survey from July 28, 1967

FCC history cards for WDUL (covering WQMN/WAKX, 1958-1979)

Contemporary hit radio stations in the United States
Radio stations in Superior, Wisconsin
Radio stations established in 1959
Midwest Communications radio stations